Langelurillus quadrimaculatus is a jumping spider species in the genus Langelurillus that lives in Nigeria.

References

Endemic fauna of Nigeria
Fauna of Nigeria
Salticidae
Spiders described in 2011
Spiders of Africa
Taxa named by Wanda Wesołowska